Major-General Sir Michael Graham Egerton Bowman-Manifold, KBE, CB, CMG, DSO (9 June 1871 – 13 March 1940) was a British Army officer. He was Colonel Commandant Royal Engineers from 1938 until his death.

References 

 https://www.ukwhoswho.com/view/10.1093/ww/9780199540891.001.0001/ww-9780199540884-e-213539

1871 births
1940 deaths
British Army generals of World War I
British Army major generals
Royal Engineers officers
Knights Commander of the Order of the British Empire
Companions of the Order of the Bath
Companions of the Order of St Michael and St George
Companions of the Distinguished Service Order
British Army personnel of the Second Boer War